Sabit Noyan (1887; Istanbul - 1967; Istanbul) was an officer of the Ottoman Army and a general of the Turkish Army.

See also
List of high-ranking commanders of the Turkish War of Independence

Sources

1887 births
1967 deaths
Military personnel from Istanbul
Ottoman Military Academy alumni
Ottoman Military College alumni
Ottoman Army officers
Ottoman military personnel of the Balkan Wars
Ottoman military personnel of World War I
Ottoman prisoners of war
World War I prisoners of war held by the United Kingdom
Turkish military personnel of the Greco-Turkish War (1919–1922)
Recipients of the Medal of Independence with Red Ribbon (Turkey)
Turkish Army generals
Burials at Turkish State Cemetery
Recipients of the Liakat Medal